Bohuslav Martinů's Violin Concerto No. 2 in G minor, H. 293 was composed between February and April 1943 between his first two symphonies and premiered on December 31 by Mischa Elman and the Boston Symphony conducted by Sergei Koussevitzky. Elman requested the concerto following the premiere of the dramatic Symphony No. 1 by the same orchestra, impressed by the work. It was referred as Martinů's only violin concerto until an earlier concerto which was thought to be lost appeared in 1968, nine years after the composer's death.

The concerto consists of three movements, with a serious Allegro preceded by a solo introduction, a gently lyrical central movement and a lively finale. The first movement is almost as long as the other two combined.

Andante — Poco allegro
Andante moderato
Poco allegro

Discography
 Josef Suk // Czech Philharmonic — Václav Neumann, 1973 available to hear on Youtube
 Katrin Scholz // Hamburg Symphony — Sebastian Lang-Lessing. Berlin Classics, 2001
 Bohuslav Matoušek // Czech Philharmonic Orchestra - Christopher Hogwood. Hyperion, 2004
 Jennifer Koh //  Grant Park Orchestra — Carlos Kalmar. Cedille Records, 2006
 Isabelle Faust // Prague Philharmonia — Jiří Bělohlávek. Harmonia Mundi, 2008
  // National Orchestra of Belgium — Walter Weller. Fuga Libera, 2011
 Frank Peter Zimmermann // Bamberger Symphoniker — Jakub Hrusa. BIS, 2020

References

1943 compositions
Compositions by Bohuslav Martinů
Martinu